Jenni Hensler is an American creative director, visual artist, costume designer, and fashion stylist based in New York City. As a freelance agent for print publications, Hensler has styled fashion editorials and photo shoots for American Vogue, Vogue Italia, Elle, Interview, and Nylon. Hensler first established herself in the fashion and music industries by working as the primary costume designer and stylist for three contemporary recording artists, namely, the gothic rock and doom metal singer Chelsea Wolfe, the synth-pop singer Zola Jesus, and the indie folk singer Marissa Nadler. Her individually handcrafted original costumes and accessories have been showcased at the Museum of Modern Art and Guggenheim Museum in New York, and at the Museum of Contemporary Art in Los Angeles.

In recent years, Hensler has increased and expanded her role behind the camera, working as creative director on various audiovisual productions: in 2017, she creative-directed a photo shoot for Red Bull Music Academy, and in the following year, she was credited as creative director on a short film produced by Stella McCartney and David Lynch titled Curtains Up, as part of a project funded by the David Lynch Foundation, to highlight the power and effects of Transcendental Meditation, and she was also the fashion director for techno DJ Black Asteroid's video "Tangiers," featuring Michèle Lamy, the wife and muse of fashion designer Rick Owens.

Music videos

Styling

Hensler's costume and styling work can be seen in numerous music videos by a variety of artists, such as in the Chelsea Wolfe videos for the songs "Carrion Flowers," "16 Psyche," "Flatlands," "Spun," and "Be All Things," and she has created stage costumes for Wolfe's concert tours and festival appearances. Hensler did styling for the Zola Jesus videos for "Dangerous Days," "Seekir," "Hunger," "Nail," and "Exhumed," and the Marissa Nadler videos for "Blue Vapor" and "Dissolve," the latter of which was produced for Pitchfork.tv. In addition to those, Hensler styled the electronic musician Black Marble's video for the song "Cruel Summer," Australian electronic act HTRK's video for the song "Chinatown Style," indie pop band Lower Dens' video for the song "Real Thing," and the video for the collaboration between Dutch composer Jozef van Wissem and American filmmaker-composer Jim Jarmusch for their minimalist classical music piece "Etimasia."

Hensler has been a crew member on a number of independent narrative films as well, including as the costume designer on the short film The Puppet Man, which features horror-film director John Carpenter, and which was screened at the 2016 Sundance Film Festival.

Directing

As a music video director, Hensler co-directed Chelsea Wolfe's video for the song "Hypnos," and Zola Jesus' video for the song "Ash to Bone."

Visual art
In 2017, Hensler presented her own first art exhibition, a multi-sensory live installation at New York's James Fuentes Gallery, titled Persona Somnia I (Latin for "Dream Persona"). The exhibition featured Spanish performance artist María Forqué suspended from the ceiling by a set of intricately knotted shibari ropes. Hensler described it as "a visual, sonic and tactile exploration of a kaleidoscopic, fragmented self as it merges into a whole," and elaborated that "the exhibit explores the act of viewing as a reciprocal one... We experience ourselves as living mirrors of each other."

Hensler is also a published photographer, working in 35mm film and primarily taking candid portraits of musicians or models in black-and-white or highly saturated monochromatic colors, and often utilizing dramatic chiaroscuro lighting techniques; her most recent commissioned photographic project was a series of portraits for Nasty magazine in July 2019.

Influences and vision

Hensler favors an aesthetic that projects female power, mystery, and eroticism. The outfits that she made as a designer and stylist alternate between or juxtapose voluminous dresses, cloaks, and sleeves, with bare skin and tight-fitting pieces in heavy-duty fabrics such as leather, latex, vinyl, plastic, and metal, often paired with large-sole boots or shoes, and accented with evening gloves, headpieces, veils, and/or geometric jewelry. She has also fashioned wearable LED lights for multiple projects, and has hand-painted directly onto fabric as well. She has been said to create "witchy, borderline-spiritual looks [that] seem to draw inspiration from the occult, fetish wear, and fantasy." Her designers of choice, who serve as influences on some of her signature looks, include Thierry Mugler, Maison Margiela, Yohji Yamamoto, Rick Owens, Ann Demeulemeester, and A.F. Vandervorst.

The vision behind Hensler's clothing, videos, and art direction draws on and incorporates elements of diverse eras, visual traditions, and movements, such as magic realism and dark surrealism, esoteric and occult symbology, Japanese minimalism, ancient Egypt, and classical mythology, as various Greco-Roman motifs, shapes, and silhouettes appear throughout her work. She describes herself as being inspired by the Jungian concept of archetypes that inhabit humanity's collective unconscious, and she has said, "Creating a dream world in the waking world is a major part of what I like to do," "[m]ixing dreams with reality... One of my passions is to create ways to take others into this place. To open a part of the psyche and create a dream-like psychedelic experience which connects everyone using minimal elements." According to one fashion commentator, Hensler "creates wearable works of art, melding mysticism and ethereal beauty with the strict order of natural science."

References

External links
 

American costume designers
American women installation artists
American installation artists
Artists from New York City
Creative directors
Fashion stylists
Women costume designers
Year of birth missing (living people)
Living people
21st-century American women